The Fenman is a named passenger train operating in the United Kingdom.

History
The Fenman was introduced by British Rail in Summer 1949. It was usually hauled by LNER Thompson Class B1 locomotives.

On 15 June 1953 the 6:55am departure from London Liverpool Street broke in two at Bethnal Green between the second and third coaches.

The train achieved some notoriety on 11 January 1961 when, hauled by British Rail Class 31 diesel locomotive D5667, it failed on a northbound service just outside Audley End whilst conveying The Queen in the Royal Saloon from London to King's Lynn. The service was rescued by an elderly steam locomotive from Cambridge, and the Queen arrived 59 minutes late into King's Lynn.

Hunstanton station was closed in 1969 and the service was shortened to terminate and start at King's Lynn.  The Fenman continued to operate as a named train until the cessation of through trains in the late 1980s.

The name was revived for a short time on completion of electrification to King's Lynn in the summer of 1992, and the recommencement of through trains to London, this time to Kings Cross, by Network SouthEast, using by Class 317 Electric Multiple Units.

In 2018 the Fenman is still being run by Greater Anglia as the 06.17 from King's Lynn to London Liverpool Street, returning at 17.07 from London Liverpool Street to King's Lynn.

References

Named passenger trains of British Rail
Railway services introduced in 1949
1949 establishments in England